Town Line Boundary Marker may refer to:

Town Line Boundary Marker (410 High Street, Barnstable, Massachusetts), listed on the National Register of Historic Places in Barnstable County, Massachusetts
Town Line Boundary Marker (Great Hill Road, Barnstable, Massachusetts), listed on the National Register of Historic Places in Barnstable County, Massachusetts